In telecommunications, direct-sequence spread spectrum (DSSS) is a spread-spectrum modulation technique primarily used to reduce overall signal interference. The direct-sequence modulation makes the transmitted signal wider in bandwidth than the information bandwidth. 
After the despreading or removal of the direct-sequence modulation in the receiver, the information bandwidth is restored, while the unintentional and intentional interference is substantially reduced.

The first known scheme for this technique was introduced by a Swiss inventor, Gustav Guanella. With DSSS, the message bits are modulated by a pseudorandom bit sequence known as a spreading sequence. Each spreading-sequence bit, which is known as a chip, has a much shorter duration (larger bandwidth) than the original message bits. The modulation of the message bits scrambles and spreads the pieces of data, and thereby results in a bandwidth size nearly identical to that of the spreading sequence. The smaller the chip duration, the larger the bandwidth of the resulting DSSS signal; more bandwidth multiplexed to the message signal results in better resistance against interference.

Some practical and effective uses of DSSS include the code-division multiple access (CDMA) method, the IEEE 802.11b specification used in Wi-Fi networks, and the Global Positioning System.

Features
 DSSS phase-shifts a sine wave pseudorandomly with a continuous string of chips, each of which has a much shorter duration than an information bit. That is, each information bit is modulated by a sequence of much faster chips. Therefore, the chip rate is much higher than the information bit rate.
 DSSS uses a signal structure in which the spreading sequence produced by the transmitter is already known by the receiver. The receiver can then use the same spreading sequence to counteract its effect on the received signal in order to reconstruct the information signal.

Transmission method
Direct-sequence spread-spectrum transmissions multiply the data being transmitted by a pseudorandom spreading sequence that has a much higher bit rate than the original data rate. The resulting transmitted signal resembles bandlimited white noise, like an audio recording of "static".  However, this noise-like signal is used to exactly reconstruct the original data at the receiving end, by multiplying it by the same spreading sequence (because , and ). This process, known as despreading, is mathematically a correlation of the transmitted spreading sequence with the spreading sequence that the receiver already knows the transmitter is using. After the despreading, the signal-to-noise ratio is approximately increased by the spreading factor, which is the ratio of the spreading-sequence rate to the data rate. 

While a transmitted DSSS signal occupies a much wider bandwidth than a simple modulation of the original signal would require, its frequency spectrum can be somewhat restricted for spectrum economy by a conventional analog bandpass filter to give a roughly bell-shaped envelope centered on the carrier frequency. In contrast, frequency-hopping spread spectrum pseudorandomly retunes the carrier and requires a uniform frequency response since any bandwidth shaping would cause amplitude modulation of the signal by the hopping code.

If an undesired transmitter transmits on the same channel but with a different spreading sequence (or no sequence at all), the despreading process reduces the power of that signal. This effect is the basis for the code-division multiple access (CDMA) property of DSSS, which allows multiple transmitters to share the same channel within the limits of the cross-correlation properties of their spreading sequences.

Benefits
 Resistance to unintended or intended jamming
 Sharing of a single channel among multiple users
 Reduced signal/background-noise level hampers interception
 Determination of relative timing between transmitter and receiver

Uses
 The United States GPS, European Galileo and Russian GLONASS satellite navigation systems; earlier GLONASS used DSSS with a single spreading sequence in conjunction with FDMA, while later GLONASS used DSSS to achieve CDMA with multiple spreading sequences.
 DS-CDMA (Direct-Sequence Code Division Multiple Access) is a multiple access scheme based on DSSS, by spreading the signals from/to different users with different codes.  It is the most widely used type of CDMA.
 Cordless phones operating in the 900 MHz, 2.4 GHz and 5.8 GHz bands
 IEEE 802.11b 2.4 GHz Wi-Fi, and its predecessor 802.11-1999. (Their successor 802.11g uses both OFDM and DSSS)
 Automatic meter reading
 IEEE 802.15.4 (used, e.g., as PHY and MAC layer for Zigbee, or, as the physical layer for WirelessHART)
 Radio-controlled model Automotive, Aeronautical and Marine vehicles

See also
 Complementary code keying
 Frequency-hopping spread spectrum
 Linear-feedback shift register
 Orthogonal frequency-division multiplexing

References

 The Origins of Spread-Spectrum Communications
 
 NTIA Manual of Regulations and Procedures for Federal Radio Frequency Management

External links
 Civil Spread Spectrum History 

Quantized radio modulation modes
Wireless networking
IEEE 802.11

ja:スペクトラム拡散#直接拡散